Polly is a chick lit novel by Freya North about a young Englishwoman—the eponymous Polly.

As a teacher, Polly takes part in an exchange scheme that brings her to Vermont for a year. There, she fits in quite nicely and starts an affair with one of her male colleagues although she has left a boyfriend behind in London. In the end they are able to sort out their differences and make up.

References

1998 British novels
Chick lit novels
Novels set in Vermont
Arrow Books books